The 2012 All-Ireland Under-21 Hurling Championship was the 48th staging of the All-Ireland championship since its establishment in 1964. The draw for the 2012 fixtures took place in late 2011. The championship began on 6 June 2012 and ended on 15 September 2012. Galway were the defending champions.

Clare won the All-Ireland final after defeating Kilkenny by 2-17 to 2-11.

Results

Leinster Under-21 Hurling Championship

Munster Under-21 Hurling Championship

Ulster Under-21 Hurling Championship

All-Ireland Under-21 Hurling Championship

Championship statistics

Miscellaneous

 Laois qualify for the Leinster final for the first time since the 1990 championship.
 Clare win their second ever Munster title.
 The All-Ireland semi-final meeting between Antrim and Clare is the teams' first meeting in the history of the championship.

Top scorers

Season

Single game

References

External links
 2012 Bord Gais Energy Munster GAA Hurling U21 Championship
 Bord Gais Energy Leinster G.A.A. U-21 H.C. 2012

Under-21
All-Ireland Under-21 Hurling Championship